Plus TV (aTV5) was a television channel produced by Asia Television, which broadcast from December 31, 2007, until April 1, 2009.

History
Plus TV started test broadcasting on December 2, 2007, and official broadcasting on December 31, 2007. It could be watched only with a standard-definition television or better.  It closed on April 1, 2009, as Asia Television restructured their channels.

Program
Plus TV mainly broadcast for information, culture and tradition, buying programs from the National Geographic Channel, Discovery Channel, BBC, NHK and RTHK.

See also
 His TV
 Her TV

References 

Television stations in Hong Kong
Television channels and stations established in 2007